The 2015 Campeonato Capixaba was the 99th edition of the competition organized by the Federação de Futebol do Estado do Espírito Santo. Ten association football teams participated. The champions was Rio Branco, which won the 37th title.

References

Campeonato Capixaba seasons
Capixaba